China Fire and Security Group is a company that specializes in selling fire protection products.

Overview
China Fire and Security Group manufactures and sells fire devices, both for protection (fire extinguishers) and warning (fire alarms). These products are geared toward iron, steel, electricity, nuclear, and petrochemical industries. They mainly serve the People's Republic of China (20 provinces) and India, and have 30 offices in that region. In addition to fire detection, prevention, and monitoring, they provide service to repair and maintain their fire systems that an institution installed.

Products
China Fire and Security provides companies firefighting equipment, including:

Detectors
Linear heat fire detectors
Multi-frequency infrared flame detectors
Long range infrared combustible gas detectors
Fixed point combustible gas detectors
Point fire detectors

Alarms
Fire alarm control units
Fire control room display system,
Fire safety monitoring center

Financial Profile

Profits (2010)
Sales - $85.515435 million
Profits - $20.394725 million
Assets -$170.326918 million

Subsidiaries
Sureland Industrial Fire Safety Limited

References

External links

Companies formerly listed on the Nasdaq